Basiliano is a comune (municipality) in  the Italian region Friuli-Venezia Giulia, located about  northwest of Trieste and about  southwest of Udine.
 
Basiliano borders the following municipalities: Campoformido, Codroipo, Fagagna, Lestizza, Martignacco, Mereto di Tomba, Pasian di Prato, Pozzuolo del Friuli.
 
Until 1923 it was known as Pasian Schiavonesco.

People
 Omero Antonutti 
 Ricciotti Greatti

References

External links
Official website

Cities and towns in Friuli-Venezia Giulia